Christian Ahlmann (born 17 December 1974 in Marl, North Rhine-Westphalia) is a German equestrian who competes in the sport of show jumping. He is married to Judy Ann Melchior (head of Zangersheide). He ranks first in the FEI Longines World Ranking List.

Ahlmann won the FEI Show Jumping World Cup with Taloubet Z in 2011. In 2014, he was the CHIO Aachenwinner. He has won several medals with the German team at European Championships, World Championships and Olympic Games since 2003. Christian Ahlmann has been seen as an exceptional talent from an early age, being one of the youngest riders ever to receive the "goldenes Reitabzeichen", at age 14, and is today considered a calm, fine rider with a soft hand.

Doping 
During the 2008 Summer Olympics, Ahlmann's horse tested positive for the banned substance capsaicin along with the horses of four other riders, and was subsequently suspended from the Games. Because of the doping charge, the German Olympic Sports Confederation sent a bill to Ahlmann for his travel and accommodation costs at the Games. As a result of the doping offence, he was struck off the German 'A-Kader' list of elite riders for two years
 and returned to the German team in 2011.

International Championship Results

References

External links

 Official website 
 
 
 
 

1974 births
Living people
Doping cases in equestrian
Equestrians at the 2004 Summer Olympics
Equestrians at the 2008 Summer Olympics
Equestrians at the 2012 Summer Olympics
Equestrians at the 2016 Summer Olympics
German male equestrians
German show jumping riders
German sportspeople in doping cases
Medalists at the 2004 Summer Olympics
Medalists at the 2016 Summer Olympics
Olympic bronze medalists for Germany
Olympic equestrians of Germany
Olympic medalists in equestrian
People from Marl, North Rhine-Westphalia
Sportspeople from Münster (region)